The following notable people have or had cystic fibrosis.

References

Cystic fibrosis
Cystic fibrosis